"Dalailama" may refer to:

 The Dalai Lama, a position in Tibetan Buddhism
 The 14th Dalai Lama, the current holder of that position
 Dalailama (moth), a genus of moths